FC Kara-Shoro Uzgen is a Kyrgyzstani football club based in Uzgen, Kyrgyzstan that played in the top division in Kyrgyzstan, the Kyrgyzstan League.

History 
19??: Founded as FC Kara-Shoro Uzgen.
2004: Renamed to FC Uzgen.
2005: Renamed to FC Kara-Shoro Uzgen.
2006: Renamed to FC Dostuk Uzgen.
2007: Renamed to FC Uzgen.
2008: Renamed to FC Dostuk Uzgen.
2008: Renamed to FC Kara-Shoro Uzgen.

Achievements 
Kyrgyzstan League:
10th place: 2002

Kyrgyzstan Cup:
quarterfinalist: 2002

Current squad

External links 
Career stats by KLISF
Profile at Footballfacts

Football clubs in Kyrgyzstan